Sângeorgiu (Romanian for "St. George") may refer to:

Sângeorgiu de Pădure
Sângeorgiu de Mureș
Sângeorgiu de Câmpie
Sângeorgiu de Meseș

See also 
Sângeorzu Nou
Sângeorzu River
Sângeorge
Giurgiu
Sfântu Gheorghe (disambiguation)